The Hazlehurst City School District is a public school district based in Hazlehurst, Mississippi (USA).

History
In 2008 the Mississippi state government assumed management of the district due to poor performance. Jackie Mader of The Hechinger Report stated that the district "was in chaos and suffering from abysmal academic performance". Circa 2014 the state was planning to allow an elected school board to once again assume control, and according to Mader, academic performance had improved during the state takeover period but that there were "inconsistent and often lackluster results".

Demographics

2006-07 school year
There were a total of 1,174 students enrolled in the Hazlehurst City School District during the 2006–2007 school year. The gender makeup of the district was 49% female and 51% male. The racial makeup of the district was 95.74% African American, 1.23% White, 2.92% Hispanic, and 0.12% Asian. 85.3% of the district's students were eligible to receive free lunch.

Previous school years

Accountability statistics

See also
List of school districts in Mississippi

References

External links
Hazlehurst City School District

Education in Copiah County, Mississippi
School districts in Mississippi
School districts in the Jackson metropolitan area, Mississippi